The Burglar is a fictional character appearing in American comic books published by Marvel Comics. The character was left unnamed in most of his appearances. He is best known as the first criminal faced by Spider-Man, and as the killer of the hero's uncle and surrogate father figure Ben Parker. The Burglar first appeared in Amazing Fantasy #15 (August 1962), and has since been featured in most versions of Spider-Man's origin story.

The character has been substantially adapted from the comics into various forms of media, including  television series, feature films, and video games. In live-action, he was portrayed by Michael Papajohn in the films Spider-Man (2002) and Spider-Man 3 (2007), and by Leif Gantvoort in the film The Amazing Spider-Man (2012).

Publication history

The Burglar first appeared in Amazing Fantasy #15 (August 1962), created by writer Stan Lee and artist Steve Ditko.

Following the Burglar's first one-off appearance, there have been multiple successors to the Burglar identity. In Marvel Comics Presents #49-50 (May 1990), Spider-Man battles a man who is explicitly described as having the same attire as the burglar who shot Uncle Ben. At one point the man cryptically states, "I owe [Spider-Man] for what he did to my brother." In Spider-Man #26 (September 1992), Spider-Man encounters another man in the Burglar's attire, minus the pistol. It is heavily implied that this Burglar's maternal uncle was the original Burglar.

Fictional character biography

Little of the Burglar's early history is known, but it is mentioned that even in his younger years he was a robber. Caught at some point in his life, the Burglar became the cellmate of an elderly gangster named Dutch Mallone. The Burglar learned from Dutch, who talked in his sleep, about a large possession of money the aged gangster had hidden in a suburban home, which the Burglar planned and schemed to get (ironically as Peter Parker's Uncle Ben and Aunt May would accidentally discover, the possession had since been devoured by silverfish).

Wanting to find out the location of the home where Mallone's possession was, the Burglar successfully robs a television station for information. Peter Parker, who had become a minor celebrity as Spider-Man, did not bother to stop him despite having the opportunity to do so. Learning that the house where Mallone's money had been hidden was the Parker house, the Burglar breaks into it searching for the money, killing Peter's uncle Ben Parker when he surprised the Burglar. Fleeing the scene, the Burglar is chased by police to an abandoned warehouse. A police officer outside Peter Parker's house told Peter Parker what happened and that his Aunt May is with a neighbor next door. Upon being told where the Burglar is, Spider-Man heads to the abandoned warehouse. Wanting to avenge the death of his Uncle Ben, Spider-Man attacks and knocks out the Burglar. It is then that Spider-Man realizes that the man is the thief he had encountered earlier at the television station. The Burglar was later left to be captured by the authorities by Spider-Man who upon realizing that he could have prevented Ben's death by simple humanitarian behavior in the earlier encounter decided to use his powers more responsibly, never again ignoring a crime if he could help it.

Years later, the Burglar had served his time and was released from prison despite being deemed mentally unstable by psychiatrists. Still searching for Mallone's treasure, the Burglar rented the old Parker home. After tearing it apart and finding nothing, he instead decided to interrogate Ben Parker's widow May Parker who now resided in a nursing home. The Burglar partnered with the nursing home's owner and head doctor Ludwig Rinehart, who was actually the supervillain Mysterio. The two took May captive and faked her death. The partnership later soured and the two criminals turned on each other, with Rinehart revealing his true nature before beating and imprisoning the Burglar. Escaping Mysterio, the Burglar retreated to the warehouse where he was first captured by Spider-Man—and where he has been holding May Parker captive. Spider-Man soon tracked down and confronted the Burglar to whom he revealed his true identity as Ben Parker's nephew. Believing that Spider-Man was about to kill him as revenge for murdering Ben, the Burglar suffered a fear-induced heart attack and died.

The Burglar had a daughter named Jessica Carradine, a photographer who had a brief relationship with Spider-Man's clone Ben Reilly. She believed the murder her father committed was an accident—that the gun Ben Parker was shot with was his own, which went off by accident during a fight—and that Spider-Man had murdered him to stop him from revealing the truth about his "innocence". After learning that Ben Reilly was Spider-Man, she first threatened to expose him with a photograph she took of him unmasked. Having witnessed Ben risk his life to save innocent people in a burning skyscraper, Jessica decided against it and gave him the photograph. She later visited Ben Parker's grave to apologize for her previous poor perception of him.

Real name
The Burglar's real name has never been revealed in the comics. He was completely unnamed in Amazing Fantasy #15, and it was only in 1996, 15 years after his second and final appearance in the comics, and the introduction of his estranged daughter Jessica, that the possibility arose that he might share her last name of Carradine. However, it remains unconfirmed whether this is the Burglar's surname, as his daughter may be using her mother's maiden name, or that of her adoptive parents. In addition, the Burglar happens to have a nephew named Jimmy Costas, in which Jimmy wears hand-me-downs from his uncle, and even said that his "Uncle" may have run into Spider-Man once or twice, which shocked Spider-Man when he found out.

Other versions

Ultimate Marvel
In Ultimate Spider-Man, a reimagining of the Spider-Man mythos, the origin story from Amazing Fantasy #15 is reinterpreted over the course of seven issues. Ben Parker's death at the hands of the Burglar does not occur until Ultimate Spider-Man #4. The name "Carradine" appears on a list of "known cat burglars", but nothing else is said about it; it's unclear whether Carradine is actually the burglar who killed Uncle Ben in this universe or is simply another criminal. Spider-Man has a copy of the Burglar's driver license but the name is always hidden when viewed by the readers; this was done intentionally by the artists.

The man named Carradine is also believed in Ultimate Spider-Man #8 to be a part of the Enforcers, a group working for the Wilson Fisk.

What If...?
Various alternate versions of the Burglar appear throughout the What If...? comic line, most often in stories dealing with Spider-Man's origin being reimagined.

One issue saw Betty Brant (here Spider-Girl after she was bitten by the radioactive spider) failing to stop the Burglar, retiring from her career and allowing Peter to synthetically duplicate her powers.
In an issue where Peter Parker is paralyzed by the spider-bite, he acquires the powers of Nova and returns home to visit Ben Parker just as the Burglar arrives. The Burglar's attempt to shoot Peter results in the bullet ricocheting off his chest and killing the Burglar, prompting Peter to abandon his costume out of guilt at his role in the death, even if it is acknowledged as an accident.
One issue features Spider-Man actually stopping the Burglar simply for the publicity. In this case, Spider-Man destroyed the life of J. Jonah Jameson by linking Frederick Foswell back to him, unaware that J. Jonah Jameson had no idea of Frederick Foswell's double life as Big Man.
One issue features Peter throwing the Burglar out of a window and killing him after the Burglar kills May instead. Ben takes the blame for the crime to spare his nephew.
One issue features Peter fighting the Burglar where he is accidentally killed by Spider-Man. After failing to resuscitate him, Spider-Man flees.

Spider-Verse
During the Spider-Verse, a six-armed Spider-Man and Spider-Man Noir visit a world where Peter had an allergic reaction to the spider-bite and was left in a coma. Because of this, the Burglar never killed anyone as he broke into the Parker house while Ben and May were visiting Peter in the hospital.

Chapter One
In Spider-Man: Chapter One, the Burglar saw Peter leaving his house wearing his costume for the first time and thought that Spider-Man was a fellow burglar after the Parker treasure as well. Confronting him, he offers to strike a partnership with the web-spinner, only to be punched and thrown in jail.

In other media

Television
The Burglar appears in the Spider-Man (1967) episode "The Origin of Spider-Man", voiced by an uncredited actor.
The Burglar makes a non-speaking appearance in a flashback in the Spider-Man (1981) episode "Arsenic and Aunt May".
The Burglar appears in a flashback in the Spider-Man and His Amazing Friends episode "Along Came Spidey", voiced by an uncredited actor.
The Burglar makes a non-speaking appearance in a flashback in the Spider-Man (1994) episode "The Menace of Mysterio".
The Burglar appears in the opening sequence of Spider-Man Unlimited.
The Burglar, amalgamated with Walter Hardy, appears in The Spectacular Spider-Man, voiced by Jim Cummings in the episode "Intervention" and James Remar in the episode "Opening Night".
The Burglar makes a non-speaking appearance in a flashback in the Ultimate Spider-Man episode "Great Power". After killing Ben Parker, he is cornered by Spider-Man, who intends to kill him, but is unable to bring himself to do so and leaves him for the police instead.
The Burglar appears in the Spider-Man (2017) "Origins" shorts, voiced by Benjamin Diskin. This version was caught by Spider-Man at an abandoned warehouse. Spider-Man attacks him, but stops upon recognizing him. Using the opportunity to break free from Spider-Man's grip, the shaken Burglar runs out of the warehouse and immediately surrenders to the police that were waiting outside.

Film
The Burglar appears in Sam Raimi's Spider-Man trilogy, portrayed by Michael Papajohn.
In Spider-Man (2002), for which he is credited as "Carjacker", he robs a fight promoter who had cheated Peter Parker out of a cash reward. Wanting to get even, Peter lets the robber go despite having the chance to stop him. After his Uncle Ben is killed, Peter chases who he believes is the murderer and discovers the robber he let go earlier. The carjacker attempts to shoot him, but ends up tripping and falling to his death.
In Spider-Man 3, the Parker family learn the carjacker, now identified as Dennis Carradine, was not Ben's killer. Instead, it was Carradine's partner, Flint Marko, who accidentally shot Ben when the former startled him.
The Burglar, credited as "Cash Register Thief", appears in The Amazing Spider-Man, portrayed by Leif Gantvoort. He distracts a deli clerk after he refuses to let Peter Parker buy a bottle of milk so he can steal money from the till. The thief gives the bottle to Peter, who allows him to escape in return. On his way out, the thief runs into Ben Parker and drops his gun. The latter sees and tries to grab it, but the thief kills him in the ensuing struggle before escaping. After Peter finds Ben's body and eventually realizes it was the thief he allowed to escape, he works to track down his uncle's killer, only to encounter dead ends.

Video games
The Burglar appears as the first boss of the Spider-Man film tie-in game, voiced by Dan Gilvezan. This version is nicknamed "Spike" and is the leader of the Skulls gang. Wanting revenge for his uncle's death, Spider-Man chases Spike to his warehouse hideout and fights through the other Skulls before eventually reaching Spike. The gang leader is defeated and tries to shoot Spider-Man, only to fall through a window to his death in a manner similar to the film.
The Burglar appears in The Amazing Spider-Man 2 film tie-in game, voiced by Chris Edgerly. Two years after Uncle Ben's death, Spider-Man resumes his search for the murderer and interrogates Herman Schultz, who reveals his identity as Dennis Carradine, a low-level thug who has been selling advanced weaponry to gangs. Spider-Man later tracks down Carradine, who hijacks a car and takes the driver hostage. After Spider-Man rescues the hostage, Carradine crashes the car and is killed by the "Carnage Killer" shortly before Spider-Man finds his dead body in an alley.

References

Comics characters introduced in 1962
Fictional professional thieves
Fictional murderers
Characters created by Stan Lee
Characters created by Steve Ditko
Marvel Comics film characters
Marvel Comics male characters
Spider-Man characters